Belovskoye is a rural locality (a selo) and the administrative center of Belovskoye Rural Settlement, Belgorodsky District, Belgorod Oblast, Russia. Population:  There are 34 streets.

Geography 
Belovskoye is located 26 km northeast of Maysky (the district's administrative centre) by road. Razumnoye-71 is the nearest rural locality.

References 

Rural localities in Belgorodsky District
Belgorodsky Uyezd